Carlos Mahecha (born 10 October 1992) is a Colombian swimmer. He represented Colombia at the 2019 World Aquatics Championships in Gwangju, South Korea. He competed in the men's 200 metre breaststroke event where he did not advance to compete in the semi-finals.

In 2018, he won the bronze medal in the men's 50 metre breaststroke event at the 2018 Central American and Caribbean Games held in Barranquilla, Colombia. In 2019, he competed in the men's 100 metre breaststroke and men's 200 metre breaststroke events at the 2019 Pan American Games held in Lima, Peru. He also competed in the men's 4 × 100 metre medley relay event.

References

External links 
 

Living people
1992 births
Place of birth missing (living people)
Colombian male swimmers
Male breaststroke swimmers
Pan American Games competitors for Colombia
Swimmers at the 2015 Pan American Games
Swimmers at the 2019 Pan American Games
Competitors at the 2018 Central American and Caribbean Games
Central American and Caribbean Games bronze medalists for Colombia
Central American and Caribbean Games medalists in swimming
21st-century Colombian people
Competitors at the 2018 South American Games
South American Games medalists in swimming
South American Games silver medalists for Colombia
South American Games bronze medalists for Colombia